MCN Radio is a radio station playing Hip Hop music based in Tirana, Albania. Previously, it was known as Radio Alsat. It could be heard throughout Europe via satellite, and was part of TV Alsat. It played a mix of Albanian contemporary and international pop music.

Radio stations in Albania
Mass media in Tirana

Radio stations established in 2002